The Baikal bush warbler (Locustella davidi), also known as Baikal grasshopper-warbler or David's bush warbler, is a migratory species of Old World warbler in the family Locustellidae.

It breeds from the southern part of the Russian Far East (including the Lake Baikal region) to northeast China (southern Heilongjiang south to southern Hebei) and North Korea. It winters from southern China south to northern Thailand.

Its breeding habitat is taiga forests, especially in clearings or at streams.

References

P.D. Round & V. Loskot, A reappraisal of the taxonomy of the Spotted Bush-Warbler Bradypterus thoracicus in Forktail 10 (1995): 159-172

Baikal bush warbler
Birds of North Asia
Birds of Manchuria
Baikal bush warbler